Homeplace, also known as Homestead Farm, is a historic home located near Frankford, Greenbrier County, West Virginia. It was built about 1850, and is a two-story, brick Federal style dwelling with a hipped roof. It has a symmetrical facade and sits on a stone foundation.

It was listed on the National Register of Historic Places in 2007.

References

Houses on the National Register of Historic Places in West Virginia
Federal architecture in West Virginia
Houses completed in 1850
Houses in Greenbrier County, West Virginia
National Register of Historic Places in Greenbrier County, West Virginia